Martin Damm and Henrik Holm were the defending champions, but did not play together this year.  Damm partnered Karel Nováček, losing in the first round.  Holm partnered Anders Järryd, losing in the first round.

Yevgeny Kafelnikov and David Rikl won the title, defeating Boris Becker and Petr Korda 7–6, 7–5 in the final.

Seeds

  Tom Nijssen /  Cyril Suk (first round)
  Henrik Holm /  Anders Järryd (first round)
  Martin Damm /  Karel Nováček (first round)
  Sergio Casal /  Emilio Sánchez

Draw

Draw

External links
Draw

1994 BMW Open